The Life of the Last Prophet was the first album to be released by Yusuf Islam (after leaving the Western pop music business in 1978, when he was known as Cat Stevens). After that time, he recorded only albums with Islamic themes, including recordings for children to learn both the Arabic alphabet and basic tenets of Islam.  This album is both an attempt to give praise to Muhammad, which is encouraged as an act of faith in the Qur'an, and an attempt to reach out to young people and those who wish to understand more about Islam, and to explain why such a popular commercial recording artist would leave the business at the height of his career.

Released in 1995, the album is a spoken-word, audio production.

Track listing
Call to Prayer [Adhan]
Introduction
The Lone Orphan
The Trustworthy
The Black Stone
Polytheists and Idols
The Cave
Read! [Surah Al'alaq]
The Opening [Surah Al-Fatihah]
Allah; the One [Surah Al-Ikhlas]
Rejection and Boycott
The Night Journey
The Lote Tree [Surah Al-Isra']
Five Daily Prayers
Al-Madinah
The First Constitution
Migrants and Helpers [Surah Al-Anfal]
Charity and Fasting
People of the Book
Permission to Fight [Surah Al-Hajj]
Battle of Badr
Truce of Hudaybiyyah
Call to the Rulers
Common Terms [Surah Al 'Imran]
Makkah Opened
Ilaha Illa Allah
Idols Smashed
Religion of Truth [Surah Al-Saf]
Farewell Pilgrimage
This Day [Surah Al-Mustafa]
The Death of the Prophet
Muhammad Al Mustafa
Supplication [Du'd]
Tala'a Al-Badru 'Alayna

1995 debut albums
Spoken word albums by English artists
Yusuf Islam albums